The Agricultural Wages (Regulation) Act 1924 (14 & 15 Geo. V c. 37) was an Act of Parliament in the United Kingdom passed in 1924 by the minority Labour Government.

It was the first attempt since the ill-fated Agriculture Act 1920 to establish minimum wages for farm labourers. These wages were to be controlled by County Wage Committees, allowing wages to be set on a local level rather than a single national scale.

These County Committees were independent of central government, and some set very low minimums, but the level of pay did slowly improve. An early draft of the Bill had the Minister of Agriculture power to override the decisions of the County Committees if they made decisions he felt unfair, but this clause was struck out by the Liberals before the bill was passed.

The law was repealed by the Agricultural Wages Act 1948.

Further reading
Digital reproduction of the Original Act on the Parliamentary Archives catalogue

References
Facts and Figures for Socialists, 1951. Labour Party Research Department, London, 1950

United Kingdom Acts of Parliament 1924
1924 in economics
Repealed United Kingdom Acts of Parliament
Agriculture legislation in the United Kingdom
Minimum wage law
United Kingdom labour law
1924 in labor relations